This is a list of cities, towns and villages in Zimbabwe. See also: Place names in Zimbabwe.

Cities

Harare Province

Manicaland

Mashonaland Central

Mashonaland East

Mashonaland West

Masvingo

Matabeleland North

Matabeleland South

Midlands

See also
 List of cities in East Africa
 List of rivers of Zimbabwe

References

Zimbabwe

Zimbabwe
Cities